Englandsfarere is a 1946 Norwegian war film directed by Toralf Sandø, starring Knut Wigert and Jørn Ording.

Plot
The film follows the Norwegian resistance fighters Harald (Wigert) and Arild (Ording) in their flight from the Gestapo.

Cast
Knut Wigert as Harald Silju
Jørn Ording as Arild Jørn
Ola Isene as Peder
Elisabeth Bang as Hilde, sykepleierske
Ingeborg Cook as Torild
Sigurd Magnussøn as Skipperen
Johannes Eckhoff as Bjørn Hjelm
Per Skift as Arnfinn
Claus Wiese as Normann
Bjarne Larsen as Jonas
Gudmund Vold as Knut, skipperens sønn
Pål Skjønberg as Torbjørn Dalsberg
Gunnar Jakobsen as Torkild
Kåre Wicklund as Espen Stordalen
Per Røtvold as Knotten
Harald Aimarsen as Josef
Kåre Johansen as Tønnes
Erik Løchen as Eivind
Lydia Opøien as Johanne Volden
Elsa Sandø	as Mor til Bjørn Hjelm
Oscar Egede-Nissen as Cramer
Helge Essmar as Mörner
Stevelin Urdahl as Drømmeren
Kristen Dahl as Suggen, fangevokteren
Karl Eilert Wiik as Kommandanten på Grini
Leif Enger as Jacob Vollen
Thorleif Reiss as Advokaten
Finn Mehlum	as Femtemann
Per Sunderland as Den navnløse
Øivind Berne as Tysk vaktsjef
Knut M. Hansson	as Gustav Karlsen
Arne Christian Magnussen as Den sivile
Knut Thomassen as NS-politimann
Roy Bjørnstad as Arne
Rolf Paulsen as Bernt
Vilhelm Lund as Ingeniør Hamar
William Nyrén as Heydner
Torbjørn Narvestad as Crause
Einar Rudaa	as Drosjesjåføren

External links
 
 
 Englandsfarere at the Norwegian Film Institute

1946 films
1940s war films
Western Front of World War II films
Films set in Norway
World War II films based on actual events
Norwegian black-and-white films
Norwegian World War II films
Films about Norwegian resistance movement
1940s Norwegian-language films
Films directed by Toralf Sandø